Orang is a Malay and Indonesian word meaning "people" or "man". It may refer to:

Places
 Orang County, in North Hamgyong Province, North Korea
 Orang National Park, in Assam, India
 Orang, Nepal, a village development committee

Other uses
 .O.rang, a British band
 Orang station, a railway station in North Korea

See also
 Orangutan, three species of great apes